The 19th Secretariat of the Communist Party of the Soviet Union was elected by the 19th Central Committee in the aftermath of the 19th Congress.

List of members

References

Secretariat of the Central Committee of the Communist Party of the Soviet Union members
1952 establishments in the Soviet Union
1956 disestablishments in the Soviet Union